Charlotte de Brézé also known as Charlotte de Valois (c. 1446–1477), was an illegitimate daughter of Charles VII of France by Agnès Sorel. She was the sister of Marie de Valois (1444–1473) and Jeanne de Valois (b. 1448), and the half sister of Louis XI of France.

Life
Despite the circumstances of her birth, Charlotte was said to be a great favourite of her father's wife queen Marie of Anjou. 

On March 1, 1462, Charlotte married Jacques de Brézé, seneschal of Normandy and comte de Maulévrier, an arranged and politically expedient match. From this marriage were born five children, including Louis de Brézé, who would go on to marry as his second wife Diane de Poitiers, herself a mistress of Henri II of France.

Charlotte was murdered on the night of May 31/June 1, 1477, by her husband. He suspected her of having an affair with one of his huntsmen, Pierre de Lavergne. Charlotte was buried at the Benedictine abbey of Coulombs.

Further reading
Charlotte de Valois et Jacques de Brézé, chronique du XVe siecle (1844)

References

1477 deaths
Year of birth uncertain
Illegitimate children of French monarchs
15th-century French people
15th-century French women
1440s births
Daughters of kings
French murder victims